Renuka is an Indian actress who is known for playing the lead role Premi in K. Balachander's Tamil tele-serial of the same name. She has also acted in Malayalam and some Hindi films.

Early life 

Renuka's family hailed from the town of Srirangam. Due to adverse circumstances caused by the early death of her father, she was compelled to move to the city of Chennai at an early age in search of work. In a short while, she was able to get a job as a drama artiste with Komal Swaminathan's troupe.

Career 

She got the break in Tamil films with the 1989 movie Samsara Sangeetham directed by T. Rajender and in the year 1990, she worked in Malayalam movie Kuttettan. Renuka has worked in a few Tamil films and about 75 Malayalam movies, after she was introduced to Tamil film director K. Balachander by colleague Geetha.

Renuka was cast in a supporting role in the teleserial Kaialavu Manasu directed by Balachander. Following Kaialavu Manasu, Renuka also did a supporting role in Kadhal Pagadai, which made her very popular and lead roles in Premi, Jannal and Ganga Yamuna Saraswati. She also earned good reviews for her performance in Premi.

Personal life 

Renuka is the eldest daughter in the family and has two younger brothers. In 1998, she married Aloha Kumaran, the chairman and managing director of Aloha India.

Filmography

Television

Web series

Plays
 Thanneer Thanneer
 Naliravil Petrom
 Irutile Thedatheenga

References

External links
 

Living people
Tamil television actresses
Actresses from Tiruchirappalli
Actresses in Malayalam cinema
Indian film actresses
21st-century Indian actresses
Actresses in Tamil cinema
Indian television actresses
Actresses in Malayalam television
20th-century Indian actresses
Actresses in Tamil television
Actresses in Telugu cinema
Actresses in Telugu television
Year of birth missing (living people)